Gertrude Dunn (September 30, 1933September 29, 2004) was an American baseball player with the All-American Girls Professional Baseball League, the league made famous by the 1992 film A League Of Their Own.

Career 
Dunn played shortstop on two teams, the Battle Creek Belles and the South Bend Blue Sox, and was named "Rookie of the Year" in 1952.

When the league was unable to continue in 1955, Dunn joined several other players selected by former Fort Wayne Daisies manager Bill Allington to play in the national touring team known as the All-Americans All-Stars. The team played 100 games, each booked in a different town, against male teams, while traveling over 10,000 miles in the manager's station wagon and a Ford Country Sedan. Besides Dunn, the Allington All-Stars included players as Joan Berger, Gloria Cordes, Jeanie Descombes, Betty Foss, Mary Froning, Jean Geissinger, Katie Horstman, Maxine Kline, Dolores Lee, Magdalen Redman, Ruth Richard, Dorothy Schroeder, Jean Smith, Dolly Vanderlip and Joanne Weaver, among others.

She later attended West Chester University of Pennsylvania and graduated with the class of 1960.

Dunn was a player on the United States women's national field hockey team. She also coached field hockey and was named to the USA Field Hockey Hall of Fame on January 16, 1988.

Career statistics

Batting

Fielding

Death and legacy 
At the age of 70, on September 29, 2004, Dunn died in Avondale, Pennsylvania when the Piper Archer airplane she was solo-piloting crashed shortly after takeoff from New Garden Airport.

She was posthumously inducted into the National Lacrosse Hall of Fame and Museum in Baltimore, Maryland in 2007.

References 

1932 births
2004 deaths

People from Sharon Hill, Pennsylvania
All-American Girls Professional Baseball League players
Battle Creek Belles players
South Bend Blue Sox players
American female field hockey players
American field hockey coaches
West Chester Golden Rams baseball players
Baseball players from Pennsylvania
20th-century American women
21st-century American women
Aviators killed in aviation accidents or incidents in the United States
Victims of aviation accidents or incidents in 2004
Accidental deaths in Pennsylvania